Pouteria sapota,  the mamey sapote, is a species of tree native to Mexico and Central America. The tree is also cultivated in the Caribbean. Its fruit is eaten in many Latin American countries. The fruit is made into foods such as milkshakes and ice cream.

The Australian and Queensland governments' research and development programs have grown mamey sapote in Australia.

Description
It is mainly propagated by grafting, which ensures the new plant has the same characteristics as the parent, especially its fruit, as it does not grow true to seed. It is also considerably faster than growing trees by seed, producing fruit in 3–5 years; trees grown from seed require 7 years of growth before fruiting. In Florida, the fruit is harvested from May to July with some cultivars available all year.

The brown skin has a texture somewhat between sandpaper and the fuzz on a peach. The fruit's texture is creamy and soft, and the flavor is a mix of sweet potato, pumpkin, honey, prune, peach, apricot, cantaloupe, cherry, and almond. A mamey sapote is ripe when the flesh is vibrant salmon in color when a fleck of the skin is removed. The flesh should give slightly, as with an overripe avocado. The leaves are pointed at both ends, 4 to 12 inches in length, and grow in clusters at the ends of branches.

The mamey sapote is related to other sapotes such as sapodilla (Manilkara zapota), abiu (P. caimito), and canistel (P. campechiana), but unrelated to the black sapote (Diospyros digyna) and white sapote (Casimiroa edulis).

Uses
The fruit is eaten raw or made into milkshakes, smoothies, ice cream, and fruit bars. It can be used to produce marmalade and jelly. It can also be fried like bacon. Some beauty products use oil pressed from the seed, otherwise known as sapayul oil.

Nutrition

The fruit is an excellent source of vitamins B6 and C, and is a good source of riboflavin, niacin, vitamin E, manganese, potassium, and dietary fiber. Research has identified several new carotenoids from the ripe fruit.

Synonyms

See also
Sapodilla
Lucuma
Mamey

References

External links

 
New Crop Resource Online Program: Sapote

sapota
Tropical fruit
Flora of Mexico
Flora of Central America
Crops originating from Mexico
Crops originating from North America
National symbols of Cuba